Jimmy Wilson (born 4 August 1930) is a former Australian rules footballer who played with Melbourne in the Victorian Football League (VFL).

Wilson came down to Melbourne after winning the Bendigo Football League's Michelsen Medal in 1951, playing for Golden Square.

He played 15 games and kicked 14 goals in the 1952 VFL season and made just two more appearances, the following season.

Wilson won Melbourne's best first year player in 1952 and then trained with South Melbourne in early 1954.

Wilson played with Rochester in 1955.

References

Links
Jim Wilson Profile at Demonwiki
Jim Wilson Stats at AFL Tables

1930 births
Australian rules footballers from Victoria (Australia)
Melbourne Football Club players
Golden Square Football Club players
Living people